The 2005 Marshall Thundering Herd football team represented Marshall University in the 2005 NCAA Division I-A football season. Marshall was led by first-year head coach Mark Snyder and played their home games at Joan C. Edwards Stadium. This marked the Herd's inaugural season as a member of Conference USA and the C-USA East Division after spending the previous 8 seasons as a member of the Mid-American Conference.

Schedule

References

Marshall
Marshall Thundering Herd football seasons
Marshall Thundering Herd football